Bryan White is the debut studio album by the American country music singer of the same name. Released in late 1994 on Asylum Records, the album produced four singles on the Billboard Hot  Country Singles & Tracks (now Hot Country Songs) charts.

Content
In order of release, these singles were "Eugene You Genius", "Look at Me Now", "Someone Else's Star", and "Rebecca Lynn"; the latter two songs were both Number One hits. The album itself reached a peak of 13 on the Billboard Top Country Albums charts, and 88 on The Billboard 200; in addition, it was certified platinum in the United States by the RIAA. Derek George, a former member of the band Pearl River, co-wrote the track "You Know How I Feel", in addition to singing background vocals.

"Someone Else's Star" was previously recorded by Davis Daniel on his 1994 album Davis Daniel. "Nothin' Less Than Love" was later recorded by The Buffalo Club on their 1997 self-titled album, from which it was released as a single that year. Neal McCoy also released "Going, Going, Gone" as a single from his 1996 self-titled album.

Critical reception
Tom Lanham of New Country gave the album 3 out of 5 stars. He thought that the album showed promise despite White being only 20 at the time, and compared the stronger songs favorably to Vince Gill. He thought that "Eugene You Genius" showed a rockabilly influence and that "Look at Me Now" was "Eagles-ish", but said that "the astral-themed meanderings 'Me and the Moon' and 'Someone Else's Star' definitely turn off White's talented light."

Track listing

Personnel

 Bryan White – lead vocals, backing vocals (2, 5, 9, 10)
 Kyle Lehning – Wurlitzer electric piano (1)
 Randy McCormick – keyboards (1, 4, 10), acoustic piano (3)
 Matt Rollings – acoustic piano (2, 4, 5, 7-10), organ (2, 4, 5, 7-10), keyboards (4, 6)
 Larry Byrom – acoustic guitar (1, 2, 5-8), electric guitar (1, 9, 10)
 Billy Joe Walker, Jr. – electric guitar (1, 4-10), acoustic guitar (3, 4, 6, 9)
 Biff Watson – acoustic guitar (1)
 Sonny Garrish – steel guitar (1, 3)
 Chris Leuzinger – electric guitar (2, 3, 5-10)
 Paul Franklin – steel guitar (2, 5, 7, 8, 9)
 Steve Gibson – electric guitar (3)
 Dan Dugmore – steel guitar (4, 6, 10)
 Bob Wray – bass guitar (1, 3)
 Glenn Worf – bass guitar (2, 4-10)
 Paul Leim – drums (1, 4, 6, 10)
 Lonnie Wilson – drums (2, 5, 7, 8, 9)
 Milton Sledge – drums (3)
 Terry McMillan – percussion (4, 6, 9)
 Hank Singer – fiddle (1)
 Stuart Duncan – fiddle (4, 5, 6)
 Michael Black – backing vocals (1, 3, 5, 7-9)
 John Wesley Ryles – backing vocals (1)
 Dennis Wilson – backing vocals (1, 3, 5-10)
 Derek George – backing vocals (2)
 Curtis Young – backing vocals (3, 6, 9, 10)
 Bruce Dees – backing vocals (10)
 Lisa Silver – backing vocals (10)
 Cindy Walker – backing vocals (10)

Chart performance

References

[ Bryan White] at Allmusic

1994 debut albums
Asylum Records albums
Bryan White albums
Albums produced by Kyle Lehning
Albums produced by Billy Joe Walker Jr.